Josip Jurčič (4 March 1844 – 3 May 1881) was a Slovene writer and journalist. He was born in Muljava, Austrian Empire (now part of the municipality of Ivančna Gorica, Slovenia) and baptized Josephus Jurshizh. He died from tuberculosis in Ljubljana.

Jurčič followed the literary program proposed by Fran Levstik and was one of the most influential Slovene romantic realists.

The -long Jurčič Trail from Višnja Gora (where he attended primary school; he also attended school in Videm) through Muljava to the source of the Krka River and Krka Cave is named after him. The house where he was born is now an open-air museum.

Selected works
 Pripovedka o beli kači (1861) (The Tale of the White Snake)
 Spomini na deda (1863) (Memories of Grandfather)
 Jurij Kozjak, slovenski janičar (1864) (Jurij Kozjak, a Slovene Janissary)
 Deseti brat (1866) (The Tenth Brother); now recognized as the first Slovene novel
 Veronika Deseniška (1881); a play
 Kozlovska sodba v Višnji Gori (1867) (The Famous Goat Trial''); a humorous short story

References

External links

 Jurčič works in e-books 

1844 births
1881 deaths
People from the Municipality of Ivančna Gorica
19th-century Carniolan writers
Carniolan journalists
Young Slovenes politicians
19th-century journalists
Male journalists
19th-century male writers
19th-century deaths from tuberculosis
Writers of the Romantic era
Tuberculosis deaths in Slovenia